Pseudomonas cremoricolorata is a Gram-negative bacteria found living on plants.

References

External links
Type strain of Pseudomonas cremoricolorata at BacDive -  the Bacterial Diversity Metadatabase

Pseudomonadales
Bacteria described in 2001